Laura Puppato (born 17 February 1957, Crocetta del Montello) is an Italian politician.

Puppato became engaged in politics in the 1990s within local environmentalist groups and was elected mayor of Montebelluna in 2002. She proved a very popular centre-left mayor in a Lega Nord's stronghold and was re-elected in 2007. In the 2010 regional election she was elected to the Regional Council of Veneto and was appointed floor leader of her party.

Puppato was a candidate in the 2012 centre-left primary election and came fourth (out of five competitors) with 2.6%. In the 2013 general election she was elected to the Senate as Venetian head of the list.

She was candidate for Senator in 2018 and for MEP in 2019, but she has not been elected.

She considers herself a cattolica adulta ("adult Catholic").

References

1957 births
Living people
Women mayors of places in Italy
Italian Roman Catholics
Mayors of places in Veneto
People from the Province of Treviso
Members of the Regional Council of Veneto
21st-century Italian women politicians
Democratic Party (Italy) politicians